Richard Drown (born 2 May 1966) is a New Zealand former cricketer. He played nine first-class and two List A matches for Auckland between 1991 and 1993.

See also
 List of Auckland representative cricketers

References

External links
 

1966 births
Living people
New Zealand cricketers
Auckland cricketers
Cricketers from Hastings, New Zealand